Deborah Nordyke (born May 20, 1962) is an American biathlete. She competed in the two events at the 1998 Winter Olympics.

References

External links
 

1962 births
Living people
Biathletes at the 1998 Winter Olympics
American female biathletes
Olympic biathletes of the United States
Sportspeople from Illinois
United States Air Force World Class Athlete Program
21st-century American women